Aurélien Passeron (born 19 January 1984) is a French former road racing cyclist, who competed for professional teams , , , ,  and the .

Major results

2002
 1st Giro di Vertova
2003
 1st Overall Tour des Aéroports
2005
 1st  Road race, National Under-23 Road Championships
2006
 1st Firenze–Empoli
 1st Trofeo Franco Balestra
 3rd Overall Coppa delle Nazioni
1st Stage 2
 6th Giro del Casentino
2007
 1st Gran Premio Industria e Commercio Artigianato Carnaghese
 1st Stage 3 Vuelta a Burgos
2009
 3rd Overall Tour of Szeklerland
1st Stage 4
2011
 4th Overall Paris–Corrèze
 6th Overall Tour de Korea
 6th Overall Kreiz Breizh Elites
 6th Ronde Pévéloise
2013
 4th Philly Cycling Classic
2014
 4th White Spot / Delta Road Race
 7th Overall Grand Prix Cycliste de Saguenay

External links

French male cyclists
1984 births
Living people
Cyclists from Nice